Trimeresurus purpureomaculatus is a venomous pit viper species native to India, Bangladesh and Southeast Asia. Common names include: mangrove pit viper, mangrove viper, and shore pit viper.

Description
The maximum tail lengths are then  and  respectively.

Scales in 25-27 longitudinal rows at midbody; 11-13 upper labials, the first partially or completely united with the nasal; supraocular very narrow, sometimes broken into small scales, 12-15 scales between them; head scales small, subequal, tuberculate or granular; temporal scales keeled.

Body color highly variable: above olive, grayish, to dark purplish brown; below whitish, greenish or brown, uniform or spotted with brown; a light line on scale row one bordering ventrals present or absent; head olive, heavily suffused with brown.

Ventrals: males 160-179, females 168-183; subcaudals: males 74-76, females 56-63, paired; hemipenes without spines.

Common names
Mangrove pit viper, mangrove viper, shore pit viper, purple-spotted pit viper, shore pitviper.

Geographic range
Found in Bangladesh, Burma, Thailand, West Malaysia, Singapore and Indonesia (Sumatra and Java). The type locality is listed as "Singapore".

References

Further reading

Gray, J.E. 1831. Illustrations of Indian Zoology: chiefly selected from the collection of Major General Hardwicke. Vol. 1, London (1830-1835).
Gumprecht, A. 2001. Die Bambusottern der Gattung Trimeresurus Lacépède Teil IV: Checkliste der Trimeresurus-Arten Thailands. Sauria 23 (2): 25-32.
Pope, C.H., & Pope, S.H. 1933. A study of the green pit-vipers of southeastern Asia and Malaysia, commonly identified as Trimeresurus gramineus (Shaw), with description of a new species from Peninsular India. Amer. Mus. Nat. Hist. (620): 1-12.
Smith, M.A. 1943. The Fauna of British India, Ceylon and Burma, Including the Whole of the Indo-Chinese Sub-region. Reptilia and Amphibia. Vol. III.—Serpentes. Secretary of State for India. (Taylor and Francis, Printers.) London. xii + 583 pp. (Trimeresurus purpureomaculatus purpureomaculatus, pp. 520–521.)
Whitaker, R. 1978. Birth Record of the Andaman Pit Viper (Trimeresurus purpureomaculatus) J. Bombay Nat. Hist. Soc. 75 (1): 233.

External links

Reptiles described in 1832
Taxa named by John Edward Gray
purpureomaculatus
Reptiles of Bangladesh
Reptiles of Myanmar
Reptiles of Indonesia
Reptiles of Malaysia
Reptiles of Singapore
Reptiles of Thailand
Snakes of Asia